Abraham Lincoln Statue and Park is an historic property located in Clermont, Iowa, United States.    The statue was erected in 1902, and the property was listed on the National Register of Historic Places in 2000.  It is also referred to as the Bissell Statue after the artist who created it, George Edwin Bissell.  The statue is a duplicate of a statue of Lincoln that was erected in Edinburgh, Scotland.  The following inscription is on the statue's granite base: "Erected in 1902 in memory of soldiers and sailors of the Civil War, 1861-1865."

The statue was dedicated June 19, 1903.

See also
 List of statues of Abraham Lincoln
 List of sculptures of presidents of the United States

References

1902 establishments in Iowa
1902 sculptures
Bronze sculptures in Iowa
Buildings and structures in Fayette County, Iowa
Monuments and memorials in Iowa
Monuments and memorials on the National Register of Historic Places in Iowa
Monuments and memorials to Abraham Lincoln in the United States
National Register of Historic Places in Fayette County, Iowa
Parks in Iowa
Parks on the National Register of Historic Places in Iowa
Protected areas of Fayette County, Iowa
Statues of Abraham Lincoln